Central Hotel may refer to:

in Australia
 Central Hotel, Cairns, Queensland, Australia, a heritage-listed building
 Central Hotel, Stanthorpe, Queensland, Australia, a heritage-listed building

in Ireland
 Central Hotel fire, Bundoran, Co Donegal, Ireland

in the United Kingdom
 Central Hotel (Glasgow), Scotland
 Central Hotel, Douglas, Isle of Man, one of Isle of Man's Registered Buildings

in the United States
 Central Hotel (Mount Joy, Pennsylvania), listed on the National Register of Historic Places